Microdaphne morrisoni is a species of sea snail, a marine gastropod mollusk in the family Raphitomidae.

Description
The length of the shell varies between 2.5 mm and 3 mm.

Distribution
This marine species was found off the Tuamotu Islands, Vanuatu, Papua New Guinea and the Philippines.

References

 Severns, M. (2011). Shells of the Hawaiian Islands - The Sea Shells. Conchbooks, Hackenheim. 564 pp.

External links
 Rehder H. A. (1980). The marine mollusks of Easter Island (Isla de Pascua) and Sala y Gómez. Smithsonian Contributions to Zoology. 289: 1-167, 15 figs, 14 pls.
 
 Gastropods.com: Microdaphne morrisoni

morrisoni
Gastropods described in 1980